Kelsey Creek flows into the Black River near Watertown, New York.

References

Rivers of New York (state)